Ventre is a surname. Notable people with the surname include:

Danny Ventre (born 1986), English footballer
Mariele Ventre (1939–1995), Italian musician and singer
Riccardo Ventre (born 1944), Italian politician

See also
Gros Ventre (disambiguation)

Italian-language surnames